Raúl Álvarez Rafael (1902 – death unknown) was a Cuban pitcher in the Negro leagues between 1924 and 1932. 

A native of Havana, Cuba, Álvarez made his Negro league debut in 1924 for the Cuban Stars (West). He played for the minor league Tampa Smokers in 1926, and played one season (1927–28) in the Cuban League for Habana. His final Negro league season came in 1932 with the Cuban Stars (East).

References

External links
 and Baseball-Reference Black Baseball Stats and  Seamheads 

1902 births
Date of birth missing
Year of death missing
Place of death missing
Cuban Stars (East) players
Cuban Stars (West) players
Habana players
Baseball pitchers